Confolent-Port-Dieu is a commune in the Corrèze department in central France.

Geography
The Chavanon forms the commune's northeastern boundary, then flows into the Dordogne, which forms the commune's eastern boundary.

Population

See also
Communes of the Corrèze department

References

Communes of Corrèze